Ivana Corley (born September 11, 1999) is an American tennis player.

Corley has a career high WTA singles ranking of 1050 achieved on 18 July 2022. She also has a career high WTA doubles ranking of 527 achieved on 31 October 2022.

Corley won her first major ITF title at the 2022 Henderson Tennis Open in the doubles draw partnering her sister Carmen.

Corley plays college tennis at the University of Oklahoma.

Career titles

Doubles: 2 titles

References

External links

1999 births
Living people
American female tennis players
Sportspeople from Albuquerque, New Mexico
Oklahoma Sooners women's tennis players
21st-century American women
Tennis people from New Mexico